The Trade Justice Movement is a British coalition, founded in 2000, of more than 60 organizations campaigning for trade justice.

The Trade Justice Movement provides expertise and analysis to civil society organisations, politicians and the media across a range of trade issues. Examples include the ways in which trade and trade agreements can impact on climate goals, poverty reduction and gender equality. It is a membership network of more than 60 organisations, including development and environment NGOs, trade unions, human rights campaigns, Fairtrade organizations, and faith and consumer groups.

TJM was known in the early years for large mobilisation campaigning. In 2005 it held a mass lobby of Parliament, which was the largest such event in the history of modern British democracy with 375 MPs lobbied in one day. This surpassed the previous record of 346 MPs lobbied in June 2002, which had also been set by the Trade Justice Movement. In 2003 the coalition staged the biggest national lobby of MPs when more than 500 parliamentarians were lobbied in their constituencies ahead of the WTO Ministerial Conference in Cancún, Mexico, when talks collapsed. In April 2005 the coalition staged the biggest mass protest of the UK election campaign when over 25,000 people filled Whitehall at an all-night vigil. In 2005 the Trade Justice Movement was one of the networks at the core of Make Poverty History, a UK coalition of more than 500 organizations lobbying for the trade justice movement, debt relief, and increased foreign aid.

From around 2010, the organisation shifted its focus towards the provision of advocacy and expertise. It has been instrumental to the collapse of the EU-US trade negotiations (TTIP), the movement against investor to state dispute settlement (ISDS) and to ensure that UK trade deals are negotiated in a way that is democratic, protects environmental standards and protects the right to health.

External links
 The Trade Justice Movement website
 Members of The TJM
 the German Trade Justice Campaign
 Video: Trade justice event, London, April 2007
 The Peru Support Group website

Development charities based in the United Kingdom
Organizations established in 2000
Political organisations based in London